Black Sheep is an EP by Canadian country music artist Dean Brody. It was released on June 21, 2019, via Open Road Recordings and Scurvy Dog Music. It includes the platinum-certified "Whiskey in a Teacup", and the singles "Good Goodbye", "Dose of Country", and "Black Sheep".

Singles 
"Good Goodbye" was released as the debut single off the EP in May 2018, and peaked at #6 on the Canadian country radio chart.

"Dose of Country" was released as the second single to radio in October 2018. It peaked at #4 on Canadian country radio.

"Whiskey in a Teacup" was released as the third single to radio in March 2019. It peaked at #3 on Canadian country radio, and at #69 on the Canadian Hot 100. It was certified Platinum by Music Canada.

"Black Sheep" was released as the fourth single in August 2019, and it peaked #5 on Canadian country radio.

Track listing

Charts

Awards and nominations

Release history

Notes

References

2019 debut EPs
Dean Brody albums
Open Road Recordings EPs